Salomão Ludy Luvunga Coxi (born 24 July 2002) is an Angolan professional footballer who plays as a midfielder.

Career statistics

Club

Notes

References

2002 births
Living people
Angolan footballers
Angolan expatriate footballers
Portuguese footballers
Portuguese expatriate footballers
Association football midfielders
Sporting CP footballers
C.D. Tondela players
Boavista F.C. players
Al Wahda FC players
Hatta Club players
Expatriate footballers in the United Arab Emirates
Portuguese expatriate sportspeople in the United Arab Emirates